Montmotier is a commune in the Vosges department in Grand Est in northeastern France.

Geography
The Côney forms the commune's southern border.

See also
Communes of the Vosges department

References

Communes of Vosges (department)